Krupali Patel, also known as Krupali Patel Singh by marriage, is an Indian gymnast. She is also a gymnastics coach. She won the Arjuna Award in 1989 for her outstanding contributions to Indian gymnastics. She is India's youngest Arjuna awardee.

See also 

 Gymnastics in India
 Palak Kour Bijral
 Arjuna Award

References 

Indian female artistic gymnasts
Living people
Year of birth missing (living people)
Recipients of the Arjuna Award